The Danish Civil Wars was a period of perpetual civil wars fought in the Kingdom of Denmark, first from 1131 to 1134 over the murder of Canute Lavard, then from 1139 to 1143 and finally a war of succession fought from 1146 to 1157, after the abdication of Eric III of Denmark, the only monarch in Danish history to have abdicated. The first phase of the war was fought between King Eric II of Denmark and King Niels joined by Magnus the Strong. The second phase of the war was fought between the son of Eric III, Canute V of Denmark, the son of Eric II of Denmark, Sweyn III of Denmark, and his cousin Valdemar I of Denmark, son of Canute Larvard. The war was the near peak of Holy Roman influence in Denmark, and for a time after, Denmark was a vassal state of Emperor Frederick I. The war ended with the deaths of 7 kings, two of whom are not amongst the official Danish line of kings, those being Olaf Haraldsen and Magnus the Strong, while the rest are: Niels I, Eric II, Eric III, Canute V and Sweyn III.

Background
Sweyn II Estridsen the founder of the Estridsen dynasty as well as the medieval capital of Denmark: Roskilde, considered the first real medieval king, he conquered a Viking kingdom and left it a feudal one. However Denmark had always been an elective monarchy, and even though for the most part, the eldest would inherit, it still allowed a window of opportunity for ambitious princes, and Sweyn had not one or two, nor three male heirs, he would father 16 - 5 of which would sit the throne. 4 kings in the course of 24 years in a rather fragile kingdom, add to that its Viking past it led to civil unrest on a massive scale, something that Eric I of Denmark would stop, he would however die after not even a decade on the throne, leaving a 7-year-old son behind him - and so Niels a brother of Eric's was made king in his stead. In the 30 years of Niels, King of Denmark reign, 26 would be in relative peace and prosperity, he was also known for frugality and piety - even among his critics such as Saxo Grammaticus, he also gifted his nephew the son of Eric with titles and opportunities, to grow and carve out his own pseudo kingdom. This nephew, Canute distinguished himself immensely, he had excellent ties with the Kaiser Lothair III, moreover he not only defended the southern border, he invaded and defeated the oborites becoming their overlord, and before this he had been ennobled duke of Holstein by the Kaiser himself. King Niels and Canute had a cordial relationship, with but a few controversies yet all ended without incident, however when the youthful and ambitious son of Niels, Magnus the Strong, who had already been hailed king by the Geats, joined the mix: relations soon grew cold - despite Canute being his Godfather. Canute was renowned for his charisma, chivalry and honour, and can be considered amongst the first true knights in the Danish history, his popularity and influence was enormous, raised by the powerful house of Hvide on Zealand, whom controlled much of the isle of Zealand, together with his control of southern Jutland - all south of the kings river, add to that his brilliant relations with the Holy Roman Empire, he could likely easily be elected king - and as an experienced commander could likely conquer the kingdom with ease. Maybe out of knightly duty Canute would wait out the rest of Niels reign until he could inherit his throne peacefully, however his enemies would not do likewise, Canute was invited to Magnus the Strong's estate on Zealand to celebrate Christmas in 1130 with him, and as an act of trust Magnus asked Canute to watch over his family while he traveled to the holy land, it would therefore prove natural that many armed guards had gathered by Magnus estate as he was to travel all the way to the levant - however Canute was mistaken, a mistake that would be his last.

The Feud of 1131–1134
 
On 7 January 1131, Magnus lured Canute Lavard into the barren Haraldsted Forest a little north of Ringsted, where the duke was assailed from all sides and murdered under the auspices of trust and friendship. The war broke out shortly afterwards, King Niels apparently tried to distance himself from Magnus and the murderous conspiracy, but soon after recalled him from his court in Sweden. Soon after, civil war broke out, when Canute Lavard's half-brother, Eric Ericson, gatheredhis late brother's levies to avenge him. Eric demanded that Magnus be brought to justice for the ungodly murder of his brother or the king would face open revolt, his forces were stopped not far from Jelling by the bishop of Ribe, who urged patience and insisted on the king's innocence, this was all a ruse as King Niels was able to gather the support of the Jutlandic nobles, and rout the forces of Eric completely. Eric was therefore forced to flee east, leaving southern Jutland defenseless, with no armies and rescuers in sight the duchy surrendered swiftly - meanwhile Eric had roused the Kaiser to avenge his companion and lawful vassal. Lothair III would march north with an army of 6000 men, joined by a naval force under Eric, after rough fighting the Emperor of the romans deserted due to revolt and bribery, a force under Adolf of Holstein stayed, but was crushed by Magnus the Strong, the bribes were however  a heavy toll for victory, the price for the German Emperor's retreat was to abandon Lund as an independent archdiocese and place it under Hamburg-Bremen. Despite these heavy defeats, the continued support of the nobles of Zealand, such as the Hvides and Peder Bodilsøn, would cause figures such as the Archbishop, Asser Svendsen, the first archbishop of Denmark who had held that position since 1089 as well as several members of the Jutish nobility, to swing over to Eric Ericson's side. With the open revolts to the north king Niels split his forces and named Magnus commander of the navy, Niels would crush the rebels in the north, Magnus Eric and his fleet, Magnus searched for some time along the Zealand coast - eventually relaxing, Eric would seize the opportunity and annihilate Magnus' fleet almost completely. Eric's navy would then raid along the Limfjord landing many troops around Himmerland, here he sacked or at least raided Viborg, where the local bishop - a supporter of Niels, Eskild was murdered during his morning service in the year 1132. 

Eric hoped to be able to crush Niels now with the help of Chistiern Aggesen, who had raised a large force in the north, but it had been intercepted at Rynebjerg, where Niels outnumbered them and had the element of surprise. Not letting the chance slip by him, as Erics raids in Jutland made locating him easy, he marched his army swiftly and took Eric's entire embarked force by surprise, and had it not been for the bravery of a few, Eric would have been captured then and there. Eric had lost all semblance of power on Jutland and assumedly Funen, moreover the only real advantage that Eric had left, which he had not squandered, his navy - was in a shambles, neither did it help the situation that Eric's brother, Harald Kesja and his sons, decided now was the time to revolt and were now also on Niels' and Magnus' side, on the condition that Harald be elected co-king. Eric quickly levied another army, and began besieging Haraldsborg, however this was a strong fortress and unlike ideal sieges, time was not on Erics side, luckily German merchants in Roskilde experts in crafting siegeweapons assisted the king, Eric would employ trebuchets for the first time in Scandinavian history, finally breaking through and butchering the garrison. However Harald had escaped, furthermore the victorious army had little time to rejoice as the winter arrived, so did Niels with a great army and 100 ships, he finally invaded Zealand, and then at the battle of Værebro, Eric lost his foothold on Zealand earning the nickname "Harefoot". Eric 'Harefoot' ended up in Scania where he desperately tried to get support, however Archbishop Asser still ignorant of Niels deal with the Kaiser, convinced the peoples of the Scanian lands to finally desert Eric - in exile he fled to Norway. 

Asser however finally caught wind of the secret deal between Niels and the Kaiser, so Eric returned to Eastern Denmark, Asser rallied thousands of Scanians to the Erican cause, Eric already possessing several hundred veterans of his campaigns and finally receiving reinforcements from the Kaiser where among them were 300 hundred German mounted knights - the first to do battle in the history of Scandinavia. In the Battle of Fodevig, on the second day of Pentecost 1134, the old king, Magnus the Strong and Harald Kesja, all co-kings with an enormous army at their backs landed on the Fotevik, in a daring amphibious assault, however the landing was contested by Eric, who with the use of the Kaisers heavy cavalry, was able to decisively defeat them. Magnus the Strong was killed in the battle together with many bishops, and Eric Ericson had on that occasion replaced the nickname "Harefoot" with the more flattering nickname 'the Memorable'. King Niels fled after the defeat to Jutland where he had his support. The 70-year-old king was apparently on his way south, for reasons unknown, when in Schleswig – Canute Lavard's old stronghold – he was attacked and killed by the city's citizens.

The Feud of 1134–1141 
While the civil war had ended, Harald Kesja continued fighting, seeing himself as the sole legitimate king after the death of King Niels. But Eric Emune captured and beheaded Harald Kesja and had 7 of his sons killed, except for Oluf Haraldsøn who escaped the massacre with difficulty. By 1137, Eric the Memorable was forced to flee as his old strongholds of Zealand and Skaane had grown hostile towards the king, he fled to Jutland, where he was murdered. Eric II would be succeeded by his nephew Eric III, who would defeat Oluf in battle outside of Helsingborg, and rule peacefully for the rest of his reign until his abdication in 1146.

The Feud of 1146–1157
Upon the abdication of Eric III, Sweyn III of Denmark was elected King of Denmark on Zealand, but with the support of Eskil of Lund, Canute V of Denmark was also able to get elected in Skåneland. Canute was able to rally an army, but his invasion of Zealand was repelled by Sweyn III at a battle near Slangerup. In 1147, Canute and Sweyn called a truce, so they could participate in the Wendish Crusade against the Wends, but they returned early after being defeated by Niklot soon after landing. Canute launched another campaign on Zealand, taking Roskilde, but Sweyn, with the help of his cousin Valdemar I of Denmark, would once again defeat Canute near Taastrup in 1149–1150. For Valdemar's contributions he was made Duke of Schleswig. In 1151, Canute would be defeated once again, near Viborg. In 1152, a German-sponsored compromise was proposed, which would have made Canute and Sweyn co-regents, but the deal was refused by Sweyn. Around 1152–1153, Canute would enlist the help of his uncle Sverker I of Sweden, and would engage in another battle at Viborg, at which he would be decisively defeated. Sweyn had taken control of most of Denmark, and he had established himself as the sole king of Denmark, a defeated Canute fled to Saxony, but fighting still continued against Sweden. In 1153–1154 Valdemar switched sides and became co-regent along with Canute V, and the two of them were able to expel Sweyn from the kingdom by 1155. In the winter of 1156 Sweyn returned with German reinforcements with the intent to retake Denmark, but peace negotiations began in spring of 1157. An agreement was made to divide Denmark into three kingdoms, Valdemar was to have Jutland, Canute was to have Funen, and Sweyn was to have Zealand and Skåneland. To celebrate the deal, Sweyn hosted a feast in Roskilde, but during the feast his men came in and murdered Canute and wounded Valdemar in what would be known as 'The Blood Feast of Roskilde'. Valdemar fled to Viborg and gathered Canute's followers to have a battle against the pursuing Sweyn. They met at the Battle of Grathe Heath where Valdemar's much smaller force defeated Sweyn, who according to legend, was killed by an angry peasant while fleeing.

Notes

References 

Wars involving Denmark
Battles involving Denmark
Conflicts in 1146
12th century in Denmark
Conflicts in 1157
Civil wars involving the states and peoples of Europe